Abram Leonidovich Khavin (1914 – January 19, 1974, Kiev) was a Ukrainian chess master.

In 1937, he took 6th in Kiev (9th UKR-ch, Fedor Bogatyrchuk won).
In 1938, he tied for 4-6th in Kiev (10th UKR-ch, Isaac Boleslavsky won).

During World War II, he won in Lviv in 1940 (West UKR-ch);
In 1940, he also took 10th in Kiev (12th UKR-ch, Boleslavsky won)
and took 11th in Kiev (USSR-ch, sf).
In June 1941, he played in interrupted (because of the German–Soviet war) tournament in Rostov-on-Don (USSR-ch, sf).
In 1944 he shared 1st in Omsk (USSR-ch, sf).
and tied for 11-13th in Moscow (13th USSR-ch, Mikhail Botvinnik won).

After the war, he tied for 5-8th at Kiev 1948 (17th UKR-ch, Alexey Sokolsky won).
In 1951 he took 6th in Kiev (USSR-ch, qf).
In 1952 he took 7th in Kiev (USSR-ch, qf).
In 1954 he won in Kiev (23rd UKR-ch).

References

1914 births
1974 deaths
Ukrainian Jews
Ukrainian chess players
Jewish chess players
20th-century chess players
Soviet chess players